Malladi Suribabu (born 1 May 1945) is an Indian Carnatic vocalist and musician from Vijayawada, India. He was conferred with Kala Ratna, a civilian honor by the Government of Andhra Pradesh in 2013 and TTK Award by Madras Music Academy in 2014. He is a disciple of Voleti Venkateshwarulu, Sripada Pinakapani and Nedunuri Krishnamurthy.

Early life 
Suribabu was born on 1 May 1945 in Dubacherla, a village in West Godavari district, Andhra Pradesh, in then British India. He is the father of vocalist duo Malladi Brothers. and vocalist Malladi Vasavi.

His father developed a taste for the traditional way of singing and being a music analyzer and enthusiast, was keen to pass on tradition to his children. Suribabu has developed an aptitude for music from his father and at the age of 9 years, he could easily reproduce songs with perfection.

Career 
In 1963, Suribabu made his debut with All India Radio (AIR) children's musical fest and got a high rating from listeners then. In 1971, he joined All India Radio as a program announcer and served for more than 35 years.

While working in AIR, he received the opportunity to work with many legendary artist, including Voleti Venkateswarulu, whom he considers as Guru and learnt rare Kirthanas from him. He also conducted two most successful programs namely Bhakti Ranjani and Sangeeta Sikshana with All India Radio, Vijayawada.

T. R. Subramaniam released a CD of Malladi Suribabu and Malladi Narayanaswami. This was followed by group renderings of songs of Annamacharya and Bhadrachala Ramadas in 2008.

He also performed for The Trinity and Other Vaggeyakara Music Festival held at Bengaluru in April 2012.

Till date, he is actively engaged in music concerts in India and overseas. He has composed over 2, 5000 songs of Bhakta Ramadasu, Annamacharya and Narayana Teertha's Krishna Leela Tarangam, produced several CDs to propagate rich tradition of music.

Works 
 Taranga Bodhana (Narayana Teertha's Tarangam teaching)
 Sadasiva Brahmendra Keerthanas (Sarvam Bhrahmam)
 Amrutha Varshini (CD of Telugu Gazals)
 Bhajare Sriramam (Ramadasu Keerthanas)
 Sangeetha Sikshana

Albums

Bibliography

Awards, titles and recognition 
 Sangeet Natak Akademi Award 2018
 Akashawani Annual Awards, 1984, 1996, 2001 & 2004
 Sapthagiri Sangeetha Vidwanmani, at the 70th Sri Thyagaraja Festival of Music and Dance, 2012
 Tyaga Bhrahma Nada Ratna by Nada Sudha Chennai, 2012
 Kanchi Paramacharya Music Award by Shanmukhananda Sabha, Mumbai
 Kala Ratna award by the Government of Andhra Pradesh, 2013
 Sri Kalaprapoorna title by Sri Annamacharya Project of North America (SAPNA), 2013
 TTK Award, by Madras Music Academy, 2014

See also 

 Malladi Brothers
 List of Carnatic artists
 List of people from Andhra Pradesh

References

External links 
 Malladi Suribabu on Swararchana, Bhakthi TV
 Malladi Suribabu on Google music
  Stress on notation on The Hindu

1945 births
Living people
Male Carnatic singers
Carnatic singers
Musicians from Vijayawada
Singers from Andhra Pradesh
Recipients of the Sangeet Natak Akademi Award
20th-century Indian male classical singers